Cha-246 or No. 246 (Japanese: 第二百四十六號驅潜特務艇) was a No.1-class auxiliary submarine chaser of the Imperial Japanese Navy that served during World War II.

History
She was laid down on 30 August 1944 at the Ishinomaki shipyard of Yamanishi Shipbuilding Co., Ltd. (:jp:ヤマニシ) and launched on 8 October 1944. She was fitted with armaments at the Kure Naval Arsenal; completed and commissioned on 22 January 1945; and assigned to the Osaka Guard Force, First Fleet. On 15 June 1945, she was assigned to the Sasebo Guard Force, Shimonoseki Defense Team, Seventh Fleet. She survived the war. On 30 December 1945, she was demobilized and assigned to mine-sweeping duties by the occupying forces. 

On 1 January 1948, she was assigned to the Japan Maritime Safety Agency as a minesweeper and designated MS-05 on 1 May 1948. On 1 December 1951, she was renamed Yamabato (まばと) and served during the Korean War. On 1 July 1954, she was transferred to the newly created Japan Maritime Self-Defense Force. On 1 April 1956, she was designated Special Affairs Boat No.2 (MS-05) and on 31 March 1957, as Special Agent Boat No. 6 (YAS-06). She was delisted on 1 June 1958.

References

1944 ships
No.1-class auxiliary submarine chasers
Auxiliary ships of the Imperial Japanese Navy